Anton Matusevich (born 30 May 2001) is a British tennis player.

Matusevich has a career high ATP singles ranking of World No. 388 achieved on 2 August 2021. He won the 2018 US Open Junior doubles title with Adrian Andreev. Matusevich won the Battle of the Brits Premier League Tennis men's event, held in December 2020.

Early life
Matusevich was born in New York City and began tennis at the age of 4. He attended The Judd School in Tonbridge.

Career finals

Singles: 4 (3–1)

Junior Grand Slam finals

Doubles: 1 (1 title)

References

External links
 
 

2001 births
Living people
British male tennis players
Tennis people from New York (state)
US Open (tennis) junior champions
British people of Russian descent
Grand Slam (tennis) champions in boys' doubles
People educated at The Judd School